Bruno Zamborlin (born 1983 in Vicenza) is an AI researcher, entrepreneur and artist based in London, working in the field of human-computer interaction. His work focuses on converting physical objects into touch-sensitive, interactive surfaces using vibration sensors and artificial intelligence. In 2013 he founded Mogees Limited a start-up to transform everyday objects into musical instruments and games using a vibration sensor and a mobile phone. With HyperSurfaces, he converts physical surfaces of any material, shape and form into data-enabled-interactive surfaces using a vibration sensor and a coin-sized chipset. As an artist, he produces art installations and performs with UK-based electronic music duo Plaid (Warp Records). He is also honorary visiting research fellow at Goldsmiths, University of London.

Early life and education 
From 2008-2011, Zamborlin worked at the IRCAM (Institute for Research and Coordination Acoustic Musical) – Centre Pompidou as a member of the Sound Music Movement Interaction team. Under the supervision of Frederic Bevilacqua, he started experimenting with the use of artificial intelligence and human movements, and contributed to the creation of Gesture Follower,

 a software used to analyse body movements of performers and dancers through motion sensors in order to control sound and visual media in real-time, slowing down or speeding up their reproduction based on the speed the gestures are performed.

He has lived in London since 2011, where he developed a joint PhD between Goldsmiths, University of London and IRCAM - Centre Pompidou/Pierre and Marie Curie University Paris in AI, focussing on the concept of Interactive Machine Learning applied to digital musical instruments and performing arts.

Career
Zamborlin founded Mogees Limited in 2013 in London, with IRCAM being amongst the early partners.
Mogees transform physical objects into musical instruments and games using a vibration sensor and a series of apps for smartphones and desktop. After a campaign on Kickstarter in 2014, Mogees was used both by common users
and artists such as Rodrigo y Gabriela, Jean-Michel Jarre
and Plaid. The algorithms implemented in these apps employ a special version of physical modelling sound synthesis, where the vibration produced by users when interacting with the physical object are used as exciter for a digital resonator which runs in the app. The result is a hybrid, half acoustic and half digital sound which is a function of both software and acoustic properties of the physical object the users decide to play.

In 2017, Zamborlin founded HyperSurfaces together with computational artist Parag K Mital. to merge "the physical and the digital worlds". HyperSurfaces technology converts any surface made of any material, shape and size into data-enabled interactive objects, employing a vibration sensor and proprietary AI algorithms running on a coin-sized chipset. The vibrations generated by people's interactions on the surface are converted into an electric signal by a piezoelectric sensor and analysed in realtime by AI algorithms that run on the chipset. Anytime the AI recognises in the vibration signal one of the events that have been predefined by the user beforehand, a corresponding notification message is generated in realtime and sent to some application. The technology can be applied to anything ranging from button-less human-computer interaction applications for automotive and smart home to the Internet of things. Because the AI algorithms employed by HyperSurfaces run locally on a chipset, without the need to access cloud-based services, they are considered to be part of the field of edge computing. Also, because the AI can be trained beforehand to recognise the events its users are interested in, HyperSurfaces algorithms belong to the field of supervised machine learning.

Selected awards
 IRISA Prix Jeune Chercheur, 13 October 2012
 NeMoDe, New Economic Models in the Digital Economy, 25 October 2012

Patents and academic publications

References

External links
 Mogees official website
 HyperSurfaces official website

Living people
1983 births
Artificial intelligence researchers
Machine learning researchers
Italian contemporary artists
Computer music
New media artists